The  ("changed cat") is a type of Japanese , or supernatural entity; more specifically, it is a , or supernatural cat. The distinction between them is often ambiguous, but the largest difference is that the  has two tails, while the  has only one.

Origin

However, cats figure in a great number of tales and superstitions because they live with humans yet retain their wild essence and air of mystery.

In the Edo period encyclopedia Wakan Sansai Zue, it is said that a cat licking this oil is an omen of an impending strange event. People in the early modern period used cheap fish oils in lamps, e.g. sardine oil; that could explain cats wanting to lick them. Also, at that time the Japanese diet was based on grains and vegetables, and while the leftovers were fed to the cats, as carnivores, the cats would have lacked for protein and fat and therefore been even more attracted to lamp oils. The stealing of household objects is commonly associated with many Japanese ghosts, and thus the disappearance of lamp oil when a cat was present helped to associate the cat with the supernatural.

The mysterious air that cats possess was associated with prostitutes who worked in Edo-period red-light districts. This was the origin of a popular character in kusazōshi (among other publications), the bakeneko yūjo.

Folk legends
There are tales of cats that became  after being raised for twelve years in Ibaraki Prefecture and Nagano Prefecture, and for thirteen years in Kunigami District, Okinawa Prefecture. In Yamagata District, Hiroshima Prefecture, it is said that a cat raised for seven years or longer will kill the one that raised it. There are also many regions where, due to this superstition, people decided in advance for how many years they would raise a cat. Depending on the area, there are stories in which cats that were brutally killed by humans would become  and curse that human.  stories are not only about aged cats, but also sometimes about revenge against cruel humans.

As an unusual example, on Aji island, Oshika District, Miyagi Prefecture and in the Oki Islands, Shimane Prefecture, there is a story of a cat that shapeshifted into a human and wanted to engage in sumo.

In 1992 (Heisei 4), in the Yomiuri newspaper, there was an article that argued that when people thought they had heard a cat speak, upon listening a second time, they realized that it was simply the cat's meowing and that it was only coincidence that it resembled a human word.

In the Edo period (1603–1867), there was a folk belief that cats with long tails like snakes could bewitch people. Cats with long tails were disliked, and there was a custom of cutting their tails. It is speculated that this is the reason that there are so many cats in Japan with short tails now, natural selection having favored those with short tails.

Folk beliefs that cats can cause strange phenomena are not limited to Japan. For example, in Jinhua, Zhejiang, in China, it is said that a cat that had been raised by humans for three years would start bewitching them. Because cats with white tails are said to be especially good at this, refraining from raising them became customary. Since their ability to bewitch humans is said to come from taking in the spiritual energy of the moon, it is said that when a cat looks up at the moon, it should be killed on the spot, whether its tail has been cut or not.

The tale of Takasu Genbei
One famous  story is about a man named Takasu Genbei, whose mother's personality changed completely after his pet cat went missing for many years. His mother avoided the company of friends and family and would take her meals alone in her room. When the family peeked in on her, they saw a cat-like monster in the mother's clothes, chewing on animal carcasses. Takasu, still skeptical, slew what looked like his mother, and after one day his mother's body turned back into his pet cat that had been missing. Takasu then tore up the floorboards of his mother's room to find her skeleton hidden there, her bones gnawed clean of all flesh.

Writings and literature

Nabeshima  disturbance
There is a  legend that takes place in the time of Nabeshima Mitsushige, the second  of the Saga Domain, Hizen Province. Mitsushige's retainer Ryūzōji Matashichirō, who served as the s opponent in the game of Go, displeased Mitsushige and was put to the sword. Ryūzōji's mother, while recounting her sorrows to her cat, committed suicide.

Historically, the Ryūzōji clan was older than the Nabeshima clan in Hizen. After Ryūzōji Takanobu's death, his assistant Nabeshima Naoshige held the real power, and after the sudden death of Takanobu's grandchild Takafusa, his father Masaie also committed suicide. Afterwards, since the remnants of the Ryūzōji clan created disturbances in the public order near the Saga castle, Naoshige, in order to pacify the spirits of the Ryūzōji, built Tenyū-ji (now in Tafuse, Saga). Also, the inheritance of power from the Ryūzōji clan to the Nabeshima clan was not an issue, but because of Takanobu's death, and Nabeshima Katsushige's son's sudden death, some point out that this  (ghost story) arose from a dramatization of this series of events.

The "Sagano" in the title is a place in Tokyo Prefecture, but it was actually a pun on the word . This work became very popular throughout the  country, but a complaint from the Saga domain brought the performances to a quick stop.

It then shapeshifted and appeared in their forms, and cast a curse upon the family. In the historical record book, this was completely unrelated to the Ryūzōji event, however, and a foreign type of cat, which had been abused by Nabeshima's feudal lord Komori Handayū, sought revenge and killed and ate the lord's favorite concubine, shapeshifted into her form, and caused harm to the family. It was Itō Sōda who exterminated it.

Other

During the Edo period (1603–1867), tales about  began to appear in essays and  collections in various areas. In the fourth volume of "Mimibukuro", it is stated that any cat anywhere that lives for ten years would begin to speak as a human, and that cats born from the union of a fox and a cat would begin speaking even before ten years had passed. According to tales of cats that transform, aged cats would very often shapeshift into old women.

The same kind of tale was also found in Taniguchi, Fukusaki village, Jinsai District, of the same province, where it is said that in Kongōjō-ji, a  who troubled a villager was killed by someone from the temple. This  was protected from arrows and bullets by a s lid and an iron pot. These, like the legend of Susanoo's extermination of Yamata no Orochi, have a commonality in that the local old families of the area played a role.

In 1909, articles about cats that broke into dance in tenement houses in the Honjo neighbourhood of Tokyo were published in newspapers such as the Sports Hochi, the Yorozu Chōhō, and the Yamato Shimbun.

Landmarks
Myōtaratennyo – Yahiko-jinja, Niigata Prefecture
The origin of this landmark is in the Bunka period (1804–1818) essay , which contains passages about strange events concerning cats. In this book, giving the character "" the reading "myō", it was written as "". In Hokkaido and the northern Ōu region among other places, similar tales are passed down throughout the country.

Neko no Odoriba – Izumi-ku, Yokohama City, Kanagawa Prefecture
It is said that in a soy sauce shop long ago, in Totsuka-juku of the 53 Stations of the Tōkaidō (now Totsuka-ku, Yokohama, Kanagawa Prefecture), it sometimes happened that napkins would disappear in the night one by one. One night, when the proprietor of the soy sauce shop went out on a job, he heard some bustling music from a place where there should have been no people around. When he looked, there were several cats gathered, and there in the center was a strange sight: the shopkeeper's pet cat, wearing a napkin on its head and dancing. That explained why his napkins had been going missing.
The place where this cat is said to have danced is called Odoriba (meaning "dancing place"), and it left behind its name afterwards in places like the Odoriba intersection, as well as the Odoriba Station in the Yokohama Municipal Subway. In 1737 (Genbun 2), at the Odoriba intersection, a memorial tower was built in order to pacify the spirit of the cat, and the Odoriba station was decorated all over with the motif of a cat.
Omatsu Daigongen – Kamo Town, Anan, Tokushima Prefecture
This landmark derives from the following legend: In the early part of the Edo period, the village headman of Kamo Village (now Kamo Town) borrowed money from a wealthy man in order to save the village when their crops failed. Although he repaid the debt, the wealthy man plotted against him and falsely accused him of not paying. In despair, the village headman died of an illness. The land which had been collateral for the debt was then confiscated by the wealthy man.
At Omatsu Daigongen lies the grave of Omatsu, where the loyal wife who put her life on the line for justice is deified. Because the legend says that the cat sought revenge for an unfair judgement, it is supposed to grant favors in matters of competition or chance, and in testing season, many test-takers would pray for success in school here.
Neko Daimyōjin Shi – Shiroishi, Kishima District, Saga Prefecture
This is a landmark that comes from a tale concerning the Nabeshima clan, similar to the "Nabeshima Bakeneko Disturbance." In this story, the  took the shape of Nabeshima Katsushige's wife and sought Katsushige's life, but his retainer, Chibu Honuemon, slew it. However, after that the Chibu family was unable to produce a male heir because of the cat's curse. At this shrine, a seven-tailed cat with its fangs bared has been engraved.
Historically, Hide Isemori of the Hide clan who once ruled Shiroishi, despite having befriended the Nabeshima clan, was suspected of being Christian, and was brought to ruin.

In popular culture

In film

 have appeared in Japanese films—including more specifically the subgenre of horror films known as "monster cat" or "ghost cat" films ( or ), a subgenre derived primarily from the repertoire of kabuki theatre.

See also
 Maneki-neko
 Kaibyō

Notes

References

 
 
 
 
 
 
 
 
 
 
 
 。
 

 
 
 
 Kiej'e, Nikolas. Japanese Grotesqueries. C. E. Tuttle Co., 1973.
 Kaii-Yōkai Denshō Database (KYDD). Online bibliographical database of supernatural folklore published by the International Research Center for Japanese Studies.
 Morgan S.H. (2000). "Bake-neko"

External links
Bakeneko – The Changing Cat at hyakumonogatari.com
Cat Demons

Fictional cats
Japanese folklore
Shapeshifting
Mythological felines
Yōkai
Female legendary creatures
Yaoguai
Cats in Japan
Cat folklore